Tayabas Bay is a large bay in the southern part of Luzon island in the Philippines. Several islands are located in the bay, largest of which is Marinduque.

The bay is bordered on the north and east side by Quezon (formerly known as Tayabas) province. Lucena, the capital city of Quezon Province, is located along Tayabas Bay, where several boat and ferry lines serve the sea lanes between Lucena and the different points in the region.

Bays of the Philippines
Landforms of Quezon
Landforms of Marinduque